Jolly & Son was a small department store chain based in Kent and the West Country. Jolly's historic flagship store in Bath has been part of the House of Fraser group since 1971.

Early history
James Jolly set up a linen drapery store in Deal, Kent during the 1810s. The business thrived, and by 1823 he opened a seasonal store in Bath for his son Thomas. The shop was a success and by 1830 became a permanent shop. The business quickly expanded and by 1852 Jolly & Son had branches in Deal, Margate, Bath, Bristol. The business sold amongst others linen, toys, silk and cutlery. However in 1889, the Bristol store was sold off. In addition to the shops, Jollys had an extensive mail order business.

In 1903, Jolly and Son was sold to a new private limited company called Jolly & Son Ltd. The main shareholders in the new company were still the Jolly family. By 1905, they had outgrown their Bath store and so moved started a rebuilding programme of the Milsom Street site. Although building work continued in 1906 the business saw sales grow to £83,050. The business still kept growing and by 1912 it had purchased 9 Milsom Street and the stock of T Knight & Son.

1918 onwards

During the First World War, business struggled so special train excursions were started, and with the visit of Queen Mary while she was at Badminton, saw the profits increase which was enough for the business to purchase the Milsom street site outright.

In 1922 the company re-purchased the Bristol store that it had sold in 1889, which was financed by the company being floated in 1923. A small furniture store was opened in Cardiff also in this year. By 1924 the turnover of the chain amounted to £264,000. However by the late 1920s and 30s the business struggled during the depression, and only minor alterations were made to the Bristol and Bath stores.

During the Second World War, the Bristol store was completely destroyed by Enemy bombing and smaller premises on Whiteladies Road was used, and eventually purchased as the stores permanent home.

In the 1961, the Bristol store was enlarged by the purchase of an adjourning three storey building, and the Bath store had a new restaurant added in 1965. By 1968 a new separate holding company was formed Jolly & Son (Holdings) Ltd was set up to oversee several other business set up, including an auction house and a transportation company.

In 1970, the business was purchased by E J Dingles and Co, who in turn were purchased by House of Fraser. The Bristol store was closed, while the Bath store is still trading as a House of Fraser store. Following a major refurbishment of the Milsom Street store in 2014, the Jolly's name has been revived.

References

Buildings and structures in Bath, Somerset
Department stores of the United Kingdom
Retail companies established in 1903
Department store buildings in the United Kingdom
House of Fraser